Half Brother is a vinyl LP record album by the band Half Brother. It is the first album by the BAFTA, Brit, Emmy, and Gramophone award-winning composer Howard Goodall.

The album was released by Ariola Hansa (AHAL 8002). It was recorded at Scorpio Sound studios, engineered by Richard Dodd. It was produced and arranged by Del Newman.

Track listing
Side one
 "You Never Tell Me" (Howard Goodall)
 "Holding Hands With Love" (Jonathan Kermode)
 "Love Too Short" (Howard Goodall)
 "English Love Song" (Howard Goodall)
 "Ain't No Rock 'n Roller" (Jonathan Kermode)
 "Mama Says" (Howard Goodall)

Side two
 "Don't Leave Me Alone" (Howard Goodall)
 "Disko Donki" (Howard Goodall)
 "Brigitte" (Howard Goodall)
 "Hey Little Girl" (Jonathan Kermode)
 "I Look In Your Eyes" (Jonathan Kermode, Dave Blackburn)

Personnel
Howard Goodall – vocals, keyboards
Jon Kermode – vocals, keyboards
John Mealing – keyboards
Bill Kristian – bass guitar
Alan Jones – bass guitar
Paul Hart – bass guitar
Brian Odgers – bass guitar
Henry Spinetti – drums
Frank Gibson – drums
Les Davidson – guitar
Alan Parker – guitar
Richie Hitchcock – guitar
Colin Green – guitar
Laurence Juber – guitar
Ray Cooper – percussion

References

1978 debut albums
Half Brother (band) albums
Ariola Records albums
Albums produced by Del Newman